Earl J. Goheen (June 11, 1895 – August 29, 1985) was an American football, basketball, and baseball coach.  He served as head football, basketball, and baseball coach at Valparaiso University during the 1921–22 and 1922–23 academic years.

Head coaching record

Football

References

1895 births
1985 deaths
Valparaiso Beacons baseball coaches
Valparaiso Beacons football coaches
Valparaiso Beacons men's basketball coaches